Logan Township, Nebraska may refer to the following places:

 Logan Township, Adams County, Nebraska
 Logan Township, Antelope County, Nebraska
 Logan Township, Buffalo County, Nebraska
 Logan Township, Burt County, Nebraska
 Logan Township, Clay County, Nebraska
 Logan Township, Cuming County, Nebraska
 Logan Township, Dixon County, Nebraska
 Logan Township, Dodge County, Nebraska
 Logan Township, Gage County, Nebraska
 Logan Township, Kearney County, Nebraska
 Logan Township, Knox County, Nebraska

See also
Logan Township (disambiguation)

Nebraska township disambiguation pages